Dhangadha  is a Village situated in Sarlahi District in the Province no 2 of Nepal . At the time of the 1991 Nepal census it had a population of 4,966 people living in 880 individual households but now in 2020 the population has been increased by 200%. It is assumed that the present population of Dhangadha is about 10,500.

References

External links 
UN map of the municipalities of Sarlahi  District

Populated places in Sarlahi District